Stoke & Stafford is a local commercial digital radio multiplex in the United Kingdom, which serves Staffordshire and Cheshire. Originally called UTV-Bauer Stoke-on-Trent, the multiplex changed its name in 2010. It is wholly owned by Wireless Group after Bauer Radio sold their 30% stake in 2013.  The service launched on 30 April 2004. Stoke & Stafford is transmitted on frequency block 12D from the Alsagers Bank, Pye Green BT, Sutton Common and Tick Hill transmitters. In February 2019, Wireless sold the multiplex to Bauer following the sale of Wireless local stations.

Transmitted stations
The following stations are transmitted on the Stoke & Stafford multiplex:

References

External links
 Switch Digital information website

Digital audio broadcasting multiplexes
Mass media in Stoke-on-Trent
Radio stations in Staffordshire
Wireless Group
Bauer Radio